Cosmia praeacuta is a species of cutworm or dart moth in the family Noctuidae.

The MONA or Hodges number for Cosmia praeacuta is 9814.

References

Further reading

External links

 

Cosmia
Articles created by Qbugbot
Moths described in 1894